The 2011 Zuiderduin Masters was a British Darts Organisation darts tournament that took place in Egmond aan Zee, Netherlands. It was the 13th staging of the event, and the last tournament to be staged that year. 
Scott Waites was in blistering form as he won the tournament for the first time, beating Martin Adams to get to the final in a sudden-death leg with a 105.12 average. Darryl Fitton was his opponent in the final, and missed two match darts for a 5–3 victory and his second Zuiderduin Masters win. Waites missed the double 18 for a nine-dart finish on his way to completing the comeback. It was a very high scoring match, with Waites hitting 16 180s and Fitton hitting 15.

Qualifying
The players in bold are the seeded players for the group stages. The players in italics qualified through more than one method.

Men

Women

Results

Men's tournament

Group stage
All matches best of 9 legs. Two points are gained for every match won. 
P = Played; W = Won; L = Lost; LF = Legs for; LA = Legs against; +/− = Leg difference; Pts = Points

Group A

Steve Douglas 90.18  5–3 Wesley Harms 92.31
 
Dean Winstanley 84.15 5–3 Wesley Harms 76.56

Dean Winstanley 89.40 5–4 Steve Douglas 85.50

Group B

Fabian Roosenbrand 88.95 5–1 Christian Kist 83.70

Ross Montgomery 99.87 5–3 Christian Kist 92.49
 
Ross Montgomery 94.89 5–2 Fabian Roosenbrand 89.79

Group C

Darryl Fitton 96.78 5–3 Salmon Renyaan 83.55

John Walton 82.98 5–3 Salmon Renyaan 78.39

Darryl Fitton 94.11 5–4 John Walton 88.11

Group D

Edwin Max 87.15 5–4 Joey ten Berge 90.45

Joey ten Berge 81.18 5–3 Willy van de Wiel 78.90

Willy van de Wiel 85.38 5–2 Edwin Max 79.68

 * If leg difference does not separate players, the player with the most legs won goes through.

Group E

Scott Mitchell 78.69 5–2 Remon Hurrebrink 74.49

Robbie Green 87.27 5–1 Remon Hurrebrink 83.01

Scott Mitchell 94.77 5–1 Robbie Green 85.14

Group F

Martin Adams 94.32 5–2 Alan Norris 94.23

Alan Norris 101.52 5–3 Tony O'Shea 89.55

Martin Adams 91.53 5–2 Tony O'Shea 91.80

Group G

Jan Dekker 87.78 5–3 Benito van de Pas 79.50

Benito van de Pas 83.01 5–4 Tony West 85.71

Jan Dekker 85.68 5–1 Tony West 72.45

Group H

Scott Waites 99.15 5–3 Geert De Vos 85.71

Geert De Vos 93.60 5–2 Gary Robson 88.95

Scott Waites 86.55 5–2 Gary Robson 79.83

Knockout stages

Women's tournament

Group stage
All matches best of 7 legs. Two points are gained for every match won.
P = Played; W = Won; L = Lost; LF = Legs for; LA = Legs against; +/− = Leg difference; Pts = Points

Group A

Anastasia Dobromyslova 4–2 Trina Gulliver

Deta Hedman (1) 4–3 Trina Gulliver

Deta Hedman (1) 4–1 Anastasia Dobromyslova

Group B

Aileen de Graaf 4–2 Tamara Schuur

Tamara Schuur 4–3 Irina Armstrong (2)

Aileen de Graaf 4–1 Irina Armstrong (2)

Final
Best of 3 sets.

 Deta Hedman (81.99) 2–0  Aileen de Graaf (68.25)

References

Finder Darts Masters
Zuiderduin Masters
2011 in Dutch sport